is a waterfall in the Yugashima district of Izu city, Shizuoka Prefecture, Japan, in central Izu Peninsula on the upper reaches of the Kano River. It is a Shizuoka Prefectural Natural Monument.  It is one of "Japan’s Top 100 Waterfalls", in a listing published by the Japanese Ministry of the Environment in 1990.

According to Japanese folklore, Jōren Falls is home to the jorōgumo, a spider that can transform into a seductive woman.

References

External links
Jōren Falls tourism home page
Ministry of Environment 

Waterfalls of Japan
Landforms of Shizuoka Prefecture
Tourist attractions in Shizuoka Prefecture
Izu, Shizuoka